Memorial Park, in Hayward, California, is a public park managed by the Hayward Area Recreation and Park District. The park contains an indoor swim center, the Hayward Plunge, which opened in 1936. The park is the access point to the Greenbelt Trails, which follow Ward Creek Canyon adjacent to California State University, East Bay. The park has a small bandstand with musical events offered on major holidays. It borders on Mount Saint Joseph Cemetery (also known as All Saints or Portuguese Cemetery) which was first established in 1875. It is operated by the All Saints Catholic Church in Hayward. Many of the historic gravestone inscriptions are in Portuguese.

References

External links
Memorial Park at Hayward Area Recreation and Park District website

Parks in Hayward, California
Swimming venues in California
Trails in the San Francisco Bay Area